Frederick Orin "Fred" Hartman (April 21, 1868 – November 11, 1938) was an American professional baseball third baseman. He played in Major League Baseball (MLB) for the Pittsburgh Pirates, St. Louis Browns, New York Giants, Chicago White Sox, and St. Louis Cardinals.

In six seasons, Hartman posted a .278 batting average (623-for-2242) with 10 home runs and 333 runs batted in in 582 games played.

References

External links

1868 births
1938 deaths
Major League Baseball third basemen
Pittsburgh Pirates players
St. Louis Browns (NL) players
New York Giants (NL) players
Chicago White Sox players
St. Louis Cardinals players
19th-century baseball players
Baseball players from Pennsylvania
Springfield, Ohio (minor league baseball) players
McKeesport (minor league baseball) players
Erie (minor league baseball) players
Wilkes-Barre Coal Barons players
Johnstown Terrors players
Altoona Mad Turtles players
Lancaster Chicks players
Toledo Swamp Angels players
Terre Haute Hottentots players
Milwaukee Brewers (minor league) players
Milwaukee Creams players
Bridgeport Orators players
Chicago White Stockings (minor league) players
Buffalo Bisons (minor league) players
Montreal Royals players
Harrisburg Senators players
Braddock Infants players
McKeesport Tubers players